National Council on Problem Gambling may refer to:

 National Council on Problem Gambling (Singapore)
 National Council on Problem Gambling (United States)